Pezzella is a surname. Notable people with the surname include:

Bruno Pezzella (born 1988), Argentine footballer
Germán Pezzella (born 1991), Argentine footballer
Giuseppe Pezzella (born 1997), Italian footballer
Salvatore Pezzella (born 2000), Italian footballer